The STATS FCS Coach of the Year award has been awarded annually by STATS LLC since 2015 to the most outstanding collegiate football head coach in the NCAA Division I Football Championship Subdivision. The winner is selected by a national panel of sports information and media relations directors, broadcasters, writers and other dignitaries.

Winners

Winners by school

References

NCAA Division I FCS football
College football coach of the year awards in the United States
Awards established in 2015